Robert Glass may refer to:

 Robert Glass (sound engineer) (1939–1993), American sound engineer and Academy Award winner
 Robert D. Glass (1922–2001), justice of the Connecticut Supreme Court
 Robert L. Glass (born 1932), American software engineer and writer
 Robert W. Glass Jr. (fl. 1970s–1990s), American sound engineer